Schuil is a surname. Notable people with the surname include:

 Han Schuil (born 1958), Dutch artist
 Richard Schuil (born 1973), Dutch beach volleyball player